Hellschen-Heringsand-Unterschaar is a municipality in the district of Dithmarschen, in Schleswig-Holstein, Germany. It is the municipality with the longest name in the country.

References

Dithmarschen

Maybe